Phoebe Noxolo Abraham (born 7 October 1960) is a South African politician who has been a member of the National Assembly of South Africa. She is a member of the African National Congress. She was number 103 of the party-list at the 2019 South African general election.

She is a member of the Standing Committee on Finance.

She was formerly a member of the Eastern Cape Provincial Legislature.

References 

1960 births
Living people
Women members of the National Assembly of South Africa
Members of the National Assembly of South Africa
African National Congress politicians
People from the Eastern Cape
Politicians from the Eastern Cape
21st-century South African politicians
21st-century South African women politicians